Cetopsidium orientale is a species of whale catfish found in the coastal rivers of Suriname and French Guiana in the region from the Corantijn River along the border between Suriname and Guyana to the Oyapock-Oiapoque River along the French Guiana-Brazil border; it is likely this species is also occurs in the left bank tributaries to the Corantijn River draining from Guyana and the Oiapoque River in Brazil.

References 

 

Cetopsidae
Fish of South America
Fish of Brazil
Fish of French Guiana
Fish described in 2003